Brownsville is an unincorporated community in Paulding County, in the U.S. state of Georgia.

History
A post office was in operation at Brownsville from 1860 until 1905. The community's name may have been intended to honor John Brown, a local Methodist reverend.

References

Unincorporated communities in Paulding County, Georgia
Unincorporated communities in Georgia (U.S. state)